Evgeny Zelenov (born 5 July 1966 in Vladivostok) is a Russian auto racing driver. He competed in one rounds of the 2007 FIA World Touring Car Championship at Zandvoort. Driving for the Russian Bears Motorsport team in a BMW 320i, his best finish was a twenty-first place in race one. Zelenov has also raced in the Russian touring Car championship and the Dutch Supercar Challenge.

Complete WTCC results 
(key) (Races in bold indicate pole position) (Races in italics indicate fastest lap)

References

Russian racing drivers
1966 births
Living people
World Touring Car Championship drivers
Sportspeople from Vladivostok